This is a list of public schools in the Canadian province of Prince Edward Island that are currently being used.  The following is a list of former schools in Prince Edward Island.

Current School List

Former School List

See also
List of school districts in Prince Edward Island
Higher education in Prince Edward Island

References

External links

Prince Edward Island
 
Former school districts in Prince Edward Island
Education in Prince Edward Island
Schools